Kâzım İnanç (1880; Diyarbakır, Diyarbekir Vilayet - 21 September 1938; Ankara) was an officer of the Ottoman Army and a general of the Turkish Army. He was of Kurdish origin.

See also
List of high-ranking commanders of the Turkish War of Independence

Sources

External links

1880 births
1938 deaths
People from Diyarbakır
People from Diyarbekir vilayet
Republican People's Party (Turkey) politicians
Deputies of Izmir
Ottoman Army officers
Turkish Army generals
Ottoman military personnel of the Italo-Turkish War
Ottoman military personnel of the Balkan Wars
Ottoman military personnel of World War I
Turkish military personnel of the Turkish War of Independence
Turkish military personnel of the Greco-Turkish War (1919–1922)
Ottoman Military Academy alumni
Ottoman Military College alumni
Recipients of the Medal of Independence with Red Ribbon (Turkey)
Burials at Turkish State Cemetery